Kandu Kukulhu, also known as Tuna Curry, is a traditional Maldivian dish. Tuna fillets are rolled with spices and cooked in coconut milk.

Etymology 
Kandu Kukulhu literally translates as "chicken of the sea".

Method 
Tuna fillets are rolled with curry paste and tied together with a strip of coconut leaf. The curry is usually prepared overnight. It is then served with rice or roshi (flatbread).

See also 
 Mas riha
 List of tuna dishes

References 

Maldivian cuisine
Tuna dishes